Southey Green is a hamlet near Sible Hedingham, in the Braintree district, in the county of Essex, England. Other nearby hamlets include Forry's Green, Cobbs Fenn and Harrowcross.

External links 

 Listed buildings in Southey Green

Hamlets in Essex
Braintree District